Delaware County Council may be:

 The governing body of Delaware County, Pennsylvania
 Delaware County Council (New York), a defunct council of the Boy Scouts of America
 Delaware County Council (Indiana), a defunct council of the Boy Scouts of America